George D. Mills (April 20, 1898–August 20, 1948) was an American politician and lawyer.

Mills was born in Chicago, Illinois. He went to the Chicago public schools. Mills served in the United States Army during World War I and was commissioned a second lieutenant. He received his bachelor's and law degrees from the University of Chicago. Mills was admitted to the Illinois bar in 1923. Mills practiced law in Chicago and served as an Assistant Chicago City Attorney from 1927 to 1930. He also served as a senior hearing officer for the Illinois Department of Finance. Mills was a Republican. Mills served in the Illinois Senate from 1943 until his death in 1948. Mills committed suicide, with a firearm, at a hotel in Chicago, Illinois.

Notes

1898 births
1948 deaths
Lawyers from Chicago
Politicians from Chicago
Military personnel from Illinois
University of Chicago
University of Chicago Law School alumni
Republican Party Illinois state senators
American politicians who committed suicide
Suicides by firearm in Illinois
20th-century American politicians
20th-century American lawyers
1948 suicides